Christopher P Kang'ombe (born 25 December 1984) is the mayor of Kitwe, Copperbelt Province, Zambia. He is an engineer by profession.

Kang'ombe was first elected as a Zambian Councillor whilst still studying in university, becoming the first Zambian to do so.

References

External links
 Facebook page

Mayors of places in Zambia
1984 births
Living people
People from Kitwe